Jennifer Grey (born March 26, 1960) is an American actress. She made her acting debut with the film Reckless (1984), and had her breakthrough with the teen comedy film Ferris Bueller's Day Off (1986). She subsequently earned worldwide fame for starring as Frances "Baby" Houseman in the romantic drama film Dirty Dancing (1987), which earned her a Golden Globe Award nomination. Her other feature films include Red Dawn (1984), The Cotton Club (1984), Bloodhounds of Broadway (1989), Bounce (2000), Redbelt (2008), The Wind Rises (2013), In Your Eyes (2014), Duck Duck Goose (2018), and Bittersweet Symphony (2019).

Grey's early television work includes the made-for-TV films Murder in Mississippi (1990), Criminal Justice (1990), and If the Shoe Fits as Kelly Carter / Prudence (1990). She starred as herself in the series It's Like, You Know... (1999–2001), won season eleven of the dancing competition series Dancing with the Stars (2010) and starred as Judy Meyers in the Amazon Prime Video comedy Red Oaks (2014–2017). She has done voice work in film and television, providing her voice in the 2018 film Duck Duck Goose and the 2008–2014 animated television series Phineas and Ferb.

Early life
Jennifer Grey was born on March 26, 1960, in New York City, the daughter of stage and Academy Award-winning screen actor Joel Grey and former actress/singer Jo Wilder (née Brower). Her paternal grandfather was comedian and musician Mickey Katz. Grey's parents both came from Jewish families.

Grey attended the Dalton School, a private school in Manhattan where she studied dance and acting, and where she met her best friend, actress Tracy Pollan. After graduating in 1978, Grey enrolled at Manhattan's Neighborhood Playhouse School of the Theatre for two years of training as an actress. While waiting for roles, she supported herself waitressing.

Career

Grey's commercial debut was at the age of 19, in an ad for Dr Pepper, before making her film debut in Reckless (1984), in a small role. She appeared in a small role in Francis Ford Coppola's The Cotton Club (1984). That year she starred in the war film Red Dawn. She then appeared in the 1985 John Badham project American Flyers.

In 1986 she played the role of jealous sister Jeannie Bueller in the John Hughes comedy film Ferris Bueller's Day Off, opposite Matthew Broderick. The film was commercially successful and received a positive critical reception.

The following year, she reunited with Patrick Swayze, her co-star in Red Dawn, to play Frances "Baby" Houseman in Dirty Dancing. The story is a coming of age love story: spending the summer at a Catskills resort with her family, Frances "Baby" Houseman falls in love with the resort's dance instructor, Johnny Castle. The low-budget film was a surprise hit, was the first film to sell one million copies on video, and is considered a classic. Paid $50,000 for her role, the film came to define Grey's career, and she was nominated for a Golden Globe for Best Actress for the role.

Grey's sole Broadway theatre credit is her 1993 appearance in The Twilight of the Golds.

Despite the success of Dirty Dancing, Grey felt that her looks would place restrictions on the type of future roles she would be considered for. After consulting her mother and three plastic surgeons in the early 1990s, she underwent two rhinoplasty procedures. The second was necessary to correct an irregularity caused by the first operation and ended up more extensive than what Grey had expected. This resulted in a nose that caused even close friends to fail to recognize her, and the major change in her appearance affected her career. Of the experience she said, "I went in the operating room a celebrity—and came out anonymous. It was like being in a witness protection program or being invisible." Grey recalled in a 2020 interview that an airline employee who checked her identity refused to believe that she and the actress the employee knew from Dirty Dancing were one and the same. Grey briefly considered changing her name in order to start her career anew, but ultimately decided against this.

From March 1999 until January 2000, Grey starred as herself in the short-lived ABC sitcom It's Like, You Know..., which satirized her much-publicized nose job as a running gag.

Grey appeared with Shirley MacLaine, Liza Minnelli, and Kathy Bates in the CBS television movie The West Side Waltz, adapted by Ernest Thompson from his play. She appeared in one episode of Friends as Mindy, a high school friend of Jennifer Aniston's character Rachel. She had a small role in the 2000 film Bounce with Gwyneth Paltrow and Ben Affleck. In 2007, Grey portrayed Daphne on the HBO series John from Cincinnati. In 2010, she played Abbey, the mother of a sick child in the season seven House episode "Unplanned Parenthood".

Grey was a contestant on season eleven of Dancing With the Stars. She was partnered with professional dancer Derek Hough. She came out very strong at first, frequently topping the leaderboard. However, injuries, stress, and exhaustion took their toll on Grey, and for a couple of weeks she fell behind. In week seven, however, she improved, tying with previous frontrunner Brandy Norwood. On November 23, 2010, Grey and her partner Hough won the competition.

In September 2011 Grey appeared in the Lifetime movie Bling Ring as Iris Garvey, the mother of Zack Garvey. On November 5 and 6, 2011, Grey stood in for head judge Len Goodman on the BBC One TV show Strictly Come Dancing.

Grey voiced Mrs. Kurokawa in the English dub version of Hayao Miyazaki's film The Wind Rises.

From 2014 to 2017, Grey portrayed Judy Meyers on Red Oaks. In 2018, Grey co-starred in the film Untogether; the film was released on February 8, 2019.

Grey also appeared at the 2015 Tony Awards alongside her father Joel, presenting a performance from the musical Fun Home.

Ballantine Books published Grey's memoir, Out of the Corner, on May 3, 2022.

Personal life

On August 5, 1987, Grey suffered severe whiplash in a car collision in Enniskillen, Northern Ireland, while vacationing with actor Matthew Broderick, whom she had begun dating in semi-secrecy during the filming of Ferris Bueller's Day Off. The crash, the event through which their relationship became public, occurred when Broderick, at the wheel of a rented BMW, crossed into the wrong lane and collided head-on with a Volvo driven by a local mother and daughter, Margaret Doherty, 63, and Anna Gallagher, 28, who were killed instantly. Broderick was convicted of careless driving and fined $175. Dirty Dancing was released a few weeks after the collision, catapulting Grey to fame. But she has said that her grief and survivor's guilt over the crash prevented her from enjoying the film's success, and led her to withdraw from acting for some time.

Grey was also romantically involved with actors Michael J. Fox, Johnny Depp, William Baldwin and then-aide to President Clinton, George Stephanopoulos. She married actor/director Clark Gregg on July 21, 2001. They have a daughter. They lived in Venice, California. The couple co-starred in the Lifetime movie The Road to Christmas in 2006. On July 3, 2020, Grey and Gregg announced they had separated amicably in January, and were in the process of divorcing. Their divorce became final on February 16, 2021.

According to a September 2015 Grey profile in Jewish Journal, Grey had recently reconnected with Judaism, saying, "I love being a Jew. I've gotten a lot more Jewish in the last five years because of my daughter's bat mitzvah, and I realized I really care about being a Jew."

Prior to her 2010 appearances on Dancing with the Stars, Grey had a physical examination to ensure that she was fit enough to compete and saw a doctor to address chronic neck problems caused by the car crash decades earlier. Her spinal cord was compressed and her surgeon placed a titanium plate in her neck to stabilize it. He also found a cancerous nodule on her thyroid that he removed in 2009. Grey said she believed the cancer was caught before it could metastasize and that she was now cancer-free.

In January 2017, Grey participated in the Los Angeles 2017 Women's March.

Filmography

Film

Television

Dancing with the Stars performances

Book

Awards and nominations

Notes

References

External links

 
 
 
 
 
 

1960 births
Living people
20th-century American actresses
21st-century American actresses
Actresses from New York City
American film actresses
American television actresses
American voice actresses
American Ashkenazi Jews
Dalton School alumni
Dancing with the Stars (American TV series) winners
Jewish American actresses
Neighborhood Playhouse School of the Theatre alumni
Participants in American reality television series
21st-century American Jews